Sergio Ferrari (17 September 1943 – 2 April 2016) was an Italian professional football player.

He played for 6 seasons (143 games, 3 goals) in the Serie A for Calcio Lecco 1912, A.S. Roma and Hellas Verona F.C.

References

1943 births
2016 deaths
Italian footballers
Serie A players
Calcio Lecco 1912 players
A.S. Roma players
Hellas Verona F.C. players
U.S. Catanzaro 1929 players
Novara F.C. players
U.S. Alessandria Calcio 1912 players
Association football midfielders